Ritchie Brothers was an Australian railway rolling stock and tram manufacturer based in the Sydney suburb of Auburn.

History
In 1857, Robert Ritchie took over the blacksmith business of Joseph Whiting of Parramatta. In 1876, Ritchie was awarded a contract by the Government of New South Wales for 150  wagons. In 1882, the business relocated to Marion Street, Auburn.

Ritchie Brothers built carriages for the New South Wales Government Railways including American suburban carriages, Bradfield suburban, Silver City Comet, 500 class trailers and 72 foot carriages. It also built D and N class trams for the Sydney tram network. It closed in the 1950s with the plant and equipment sold to Australian Electrical Industries.

References

Manufacturing companies established in 1857
Defunct rolling stock manufacturers of Australia
1857 establishments in Australia
1950s disestablishments in Australia